The Sun Hill Fire may refer to:

Sun Hill fire (2002), The Bill storyline which killed six characters
Sun Hill fire (2005), The Bill storyline  which killed three characters